Thunder in Carolina is a 1960 stock car racing film directed by Paul Helmick and starring Rory Calhoun, Alan Hale, Jr., and Connie Hines. Written by Alexander Richards, it contains 1959-vintage stock car race footage.

Filmed at a number of small dirt ovals in the South, the film is set in the 1959 edition of NASCAR's Southern 500 at Darlington Raceway in Darlington, South Carolina.

Plot
A stock-car veteran (Rory Calhoun) teaches a grease monkey to race in the Southern 500 in Darlington, S.C.

Cast
 Rory Calhoun	 ... 	Mitch Cooper
 Alan Hale, Jr.	... 	Buddy Schaeffer
 Connie Hines	... 	Rene York
 Race Gentry	... 	Les York (billed as John Gentry)
 Ed McGrath	... 	Reichert
 Troyanne Ross	... 	Kay Hill
 Helen Downey	... 	Eve Mason
 Van Casey	... 	Stoogie
 Tripplie Wisecup	... 	Myrtle Webb
 Carey Loftin	... 	Tommy Webb
 Billie Langston	... 	Peaches
 Ann Stevens	... 	Singer
 George Rembert, Jr.	... 	Junior Thorsen
 Olwen Roney	... 	Motel manager
 Richard Taylor	... 	Higgins
 George Fordham  ...     Waiter

Production
All filming was done during 1959 with much of the footage taken during the actual event. A film car was entered to capture on-track sequences and Rory Calhoun actually ran some laps during the race. Calhoun drives a two-tone 1957 Chevrolet, with a blue body and white top, while his friend-turned-competitor "Les York" is in a 1959 Oldsmobile.

The film is a "B" grade production in terms of budget but Thunder In Carolina managed to capture much of the sound and fury of the era.

Release
The film had its opening engagements on June 7, 1960 in Darlington, Florence and Hartsville, South Carolina.

The film was later marketed on home video as Hard Drivin with a freeze-frame title spliced into the opening.

Reception
It grossed $271,847 in its first week in a 100 theater saturation release in the Carolinas. The film was released nationally on July 15, 1960. Quentin Tarantino is a fan of the film.

See also
 List of American films of 1960

References

External links

 Thunder in Carolina in the Internet Movie Database

1960 films
1960s sports films
American auto racing films
American romantic drama films
Films shot in South Carolina
NASCAR mass media
1960s English-language films
1960s American films